Collage is an album by the Italian progressive rock band Le Orme. It was released in 1971. It is the first progressive-like album by the band, who had previously recorded only the beat-oriented Ad Gloriam of 1968.

Songs
The album begins with the instrumental "Collage", then continues with the sad song "Era inverno" ("It Was Winter"), a conversation between a man and a harlot. The third song, "Cemento armato" ("Reinforced Concrete"), is introduced by piano and describes the situation in the cities. "Sguardo verso il cielo" ("Glance Toward the Sky") was released as a single in 1971. "Evasione totale" is very near to experimental rock, as "Immagini" is near to psychedelic rock. "Morte di un fiore" ("Death of a Flower") concludes the album.

Track listing
Side 1
"Collage" - 4:49
"Era inverno" - 5:05 
"Cemento armato" - 7:13
Side 2
"Sguardo verso il cielo" - 4:19
"Evasione totale" - 7:01
"Immagini" - 3:03
"Morte di un fiore" - 3:05

Personnel 
 Tony Pagliuca – keyboards
 Aldo Tagliapietra – voice, bass, guitars
 Michi Dei Rossi – drums, percussions

Releases

 CD	Collage Philips / Universal Distribution	 1990
 CD	Collage Philips	 2004
 CD	Collage Universal Distribution	 2004
 CD	Collage Universal Distribution	 2007
 CD	Collage Universal Distribution / Universal Japan	 2010
 Digi	Collage Mercury / Strategic Marketing	 2010

References

External links
Creative Commons review 

1971 albums
Le Orme albums
Italian-language albums